Huayuan Road Subdistrict  is a subdistrict of eastern Haidian District, Beijing. It borders Xueyuan Road Subdistrict to its north, Yayuncun and Anzhen Subdistricts to its east, Desheng and Beitaipingzhuang Subdistricts to its south, and Zhongguancun Subdistrict to its west. As of 2020, it had 139,362 residents under its administration. It was created in March 2000, when parts of Beitaipingzhuang and Xueyuan were separated from their respective subdistricts and merged.

Administrative Divisions 
In the year 2021, the subdistrict had 27 communities within its borders:

See also
List of township-level divisions of Beijing

References 

Haidian District
Subdistricts of Beijing